Andrew Atkinson Humphreys (November 2, 1810December 27, 1883), was a career United States Army officer, civil engineer, and a Union General in the American Civil War.  He served in senior positions in the Army of the Potomac, including division command, chief of staff, and corps command, and was Chief Engineer of the U.S. Army.

Early life
Andrew Atkinson Humphreys was born in Philadelphia, Pennsylvania, to a family with Quaker ancestry.  His grandfather, Joshua, was the "Father of the American Navy", who had served as chief naval constructor from 1794–1801 and designed the first U.S. warships, six frigates, the USS Constitution ("Old Ironsides") and her sister ships.  Andrew's father, Samuel designed and built the USS Pennsylvania, the largest and most heavily armed ship at the time.  Samuel, like his father, was a chief naval constructor from 1826–1846. Andrew graduated from Nazareth Hall (predecessor to the present-day Moravian College and Theological Seminary). Thereafter, he entered the United States Military Academy, more commonly known as West Point, at the age of seventeen.  He graduated from the Academy on July 1, 1831.  Upon graduation Humphreys joined the second artillery regiment at Fort Moultrie in South Carolina.  Near the beginning of the Seminole Wars he followed his regiment in the summer of 1836 to Florida where he received his first combat experience, while also falling ill, having to leave by September. J. Watts De Peyster, who rose to brevet major general for the New York Volunteer Army during the Civil War and later Civil War historian says:

After being reinstated in the engineer corps in 1844 Humphreys was put in charge of the Central Office of the Coast Survey at Washington and appointed to captain in 1848.  During 1850 he was directed to commence surveys and investigate the Mississippi River Delta in order to figure out what could prevent inundation and increase the depth of water on the bars.  This work took up ten years of Humphreys' life, during which he  visited Europe.  From 1853–1857 he also worked on the Pacific Railroad Surveys with Secretary of War Jefferson Davis.  Humphreys, along with 100 plus men (soldiers, scientist and technicians) went west to find the most practical route for the First transcontinental railroad.  Just before the Civil War, Humphreys was ranked among the upper echelon of American Scientist and gained membership to the American Philosophical Society.

Civil War

After the outbreak of the Civil War, Humphreys was promoted (August 6, 1861) to major and became chief topographical engineer in Maj. Gen. George B. McClellan's Army of the Potomac.  Humphreys was put in this position because of his achievements in life but also because "those in power at Washington distrusted him because of his intimacy with Jefferson Davis before the war." Initially involved in planning the defenses of Washington, D.C., by March 1862, he shipped out with McClellan for the Peninsula Campaign.  He was promoted to brigadier general of volunteers on April 28 and on September 12 assumed command of the new 3rd Division in the V Corps of the Army of the Potomac.  He led the division in a reserve role in the Battle of Antietam.  At the Battle of Fredericksburg, his division achieved the farthest advance against fierce Confederate fire from Marye's Heights, with Humphreys personally commanding from the very front of the line on horseback, while five of his seven staff were shot down.  During the battle Humphreys himself had two of horses shot from under him and finding a third he continued to ride, having his clothes pierced but himself unharmed.  His corps commander, Brig. Gen. Daniel Butterfield, wrote: "I hardly know how to express my appreciation of the soldierly qualities, the gallantry, and energy displayed by my division commanders, Generals George Sykes, Humphreys, and Charles Griffin." General Butterfield goes on to talk personally about Humphreys' actions: "General Humphreys personally led his division in the most gallant manner. His attack was spirited, and worthy of veterans.  Made as it was by raw troops, the value of the example set by the division commander can hardly be estimated." For an officer with little combat experience, he inspired his troops with his personal bravery. Historian Larry Tagg wrote:

Although respected by his men for his bravery under fire, Humphreys was not well liked by them. In his mid-fifties, they considered him an old man, despite his relatively youthful appearance. His nickname was "Old Goggle Eyes" for his eyeglasses. He was a taskmaster and strict disciplinarian. Charles A. Dana, the Assistant Secretary of War, called him a man of "distinguished and brilliant profanity."

At the Battle of Chancellorsville, Humphreys' division was attacked by Colquitt's brigade on the 3rd day of the battle.  On May 23, 1863, Humphreys was transferred to the command of the 2nd Division in the III Corps, under Maj. Gen. Daniel E. Sickles. When Meade assumed command of the Army of the Potomac just before the Battle of Gettysburg, he asked Humphreys to be his chief of staff, replacing Maj. Gen. Daniel Butterfield, who was considered to be too close politically to the previous commander, Maj. Gen. Joseph Hooker. Humphreys declined the opportunity to give up his division command.  His new division immediately saw action at Gettysburg where, on July 2, 1863, Sickles insubordinately moved his corps from its assigned defensive position on Cemetery Ridge.  Humphreys' new position was on the Emmitsburg Road, part of a salient directly in the path of the Confederate assault, and it was too long a front for a single division to defend. Assaulted by the division of Maj. Gen. Lafayette McLaws, Humphreys' three brigades were demolished; Sickles had pulled back Humphrey's reserve brigade to shore up the neighboring division (Maj. Gen. David B. Birney), which was the first to be attacked. Humphreys put up the best fight that could have been expected and was eventually able to reform his survivors on Cemetery Ridge, but his division and the entire corps were finished as a fighting force.

Humphreys was promoted to major general of volunteers on July 8, 1863, and finally acceded to Meade's request to serve as his chief of staff; he did not have much of a division left to command. He served in that position through the Bristoe and Mine Run campaigns that fall, and the Overland Campaign and the Siege of Petersburg in 1864. In November 1864, he assumed command of the II Corps, which he led for the rest of the siege and during the pursuit of Gen. Robert E. Lee to Appomattox Court House and surrender.  On March 13, 1865, he was breveted brigadier general in the regular army and then on May 26, 1865, he was awarded brevet major general in the regular army for "gallant and meritorious service at the battle of Gettysburg" for the Battle of Sayler's Creek during Lee's retreat.

Postbellum
After the war, Humphreys commanded the District of Pennsylvania.  He became a permanent brigadier general and Chief of Engineers in 1866.  "He oversaw a corps whose personnel—consisting of only about 100 officers and an equal number of civilian assistants—were greatly taxed by the numerous responsibilities heaped upon them.  River and harbor work increased from 49 projects and 26 surveys in 1866 to 371 projects and 135 surveys in 1882". He held this position until June 30, 1879, when he retired, serving during this period on lighthouse and other engineering boards.

Humphreys was awarded the honorary degree of LL.D. by Harvard University in 1868.  In retirement, he studied philosophy and was one of the incorporators of the National Academy of Sciences.  Humphreys's published works were highlighted by the 1861 Report on the Physics and Hydraulics of the Mississippi River, co-authored with Lt. Henry Abbot, which gave him considerable prominence in the scientific community. In 1871, he co-founded the Philosophical Society of Washington, a scientific organization. He also wrote personal accounts of the war, published in 1883: From Gettysburg to the Rapidan and The Virginia Campaign of '64 and '65. He died in Washington, D.C. and is buried there in the Congressional Cemetery.

A military base in Virginia was founded during World War I as Camp A. A. Humphreys, named for Andrew A. Humphreys.  The post was renamed Fort Belvoir in the 1930s in recognition of the Belvoir plantation that once occupied the site, but the adjacent United States Army Corps of Engineers Humphreys Engineer Center retains part of the original namesake. In 1935, after the base in Virginia was renamed, the Washington Arsenal in Washington, DC was named in his honor. But in 1948, the Washington, D.C., base was renamed Fort McNair in honor of Lesley J. McNair who died in World War II.

Humphreys Peak, 12,633', Arizona's highest peak, is named in honor of General A.A. Humphreys.

See also

 List of American Civil War generals (Union)

Notes

References
 de Peyster, John W. Andrew Atkinson Humphreys, of Pennsylvania: Brigadier General and Brevet Major General, U.S.A., Major General, U.S.V., Chief of Staff and Commander of the Combined Second-Third Corps, Army of the Potomac, Chief of Engineers, U.S.A. (Lancaster: Lancaster Intelligencer Print, 1886).
 Eicher, John H., and David J. Eicher. Civil War High Commands. Stanford, CA: Stanford University Press, 2001. .
 Harper's Weekly. January 16, 1864.
 Martin Reuss. "Humphreys, Andrew Atkinson"; American National Biography Online, Copyright © 2000 American Council of Learned Societies. Published by Oxford University Press.
 Pearcy, Matthew T., and Andrew Atkinson Humphreys. "Andrew Atkinson Humphreys' Seminole War Field Journal." The Florida Historical Quarterly 2 (2006).
 Stockpole, Edward J. Drama on the Rappahannock: Fredericksburg Campaign (Harrisburg: The Telegraph Press, 1956)
 Tagg, Larry. The Generals of Gettysburg. Campbell, CA: Savas Publishing, 1998. .
 "The Army." United States Service Magazine 4.5 (1865). American Antiquarian Society (AAS) Historical Periodicals Collection: Series 4.
 The Union Generals Speak: The Meade Hearings on the Battle of Gettysburg. Edited by Bill Hyde. Baton Rouge, LA: Louisiana State University Press, 2003.
 U.S. War Department. The War of the Rebellion: a Compilation of the Official Records of the Union and Confederate Armies. Washington, DC: U.S. Government Printing Office, 1880–1901.

Further reading

External links

 
 The Andrew Atkinson Humphreys papers, including materials spanning the course of his career, are available for research use at the Historical Society of Pennsylvania.
 National Academy of Sciences Biographical Memoir

1810 births
1883 deaths
American people of Welsh descent
Burials at the Congressional Cemetery
Military personnel from Philadelphia
People of Pennsylvania in the American Civil War
Union Army generals
United States Military Academy alumni